The War of the Succession of Landshut resulted from a dispute between the duchies of Bavaria-Munich (Bayern-München in German) and Bavaria-Landshut (Bayern-Landshut). An earlier agreement between the different Wittelsbach lines, the Treaty of Pavia (1329), concerned the law of succession and stated that if one branch should become extinct in the male line then the other would inherit. This agreement disregarded imperial law, which stipulated that the Holy Roman Emperor should inherit should a line fail.

George, Duke of Bavaria-Landshut, and his wife Hedwig Jagiellon failed to produce a male heir, so George—in a breach of both imperial law and the house treaty—named his daughter Elisabeth as his heir. Because of the agreement, Duke Albert of the Munich line did not accept George's decision, leading to war in 1503. Over the course of this two-year war, many villages surrounding Landshut were reduced to ashes, such as Ergolding, Haimhausen and Landau an der Isar.

The war ended in 1505 with the death of Elisabeth and her husband Ruprecht, Count Palatine of the Rhine, and a decision through arbitration by Emperor Maximilian I on 30 July 1505 at the Diet of Cologne. George's two grandsons, Otto Henry (Otto-Heinrich) and Philip, retained Palatinate-Neuburg (Junge Pfalz), a fragmented region from the upper Danube extending from above Franconia to the northern part of the Upper Palatinate. Neuburg an der Donau was chosen as the capital of the new state. Because the two heirs had not yet reached their majority, Frederick II, Count Palatine of the Rhine, served as regent in a caretaker regime.  The rest of the territory went to the Munich line of the House of Wittelsbach.

The emperor took the territory around Kufstein for himself as reward for his mediation; the Imperial City of Nuremberg gained important territories to the east of the city, including Lauf, Hersbruck, and Altdorf. As Count Palatine, Otto-Heinrich spent huge sums of money to build a palace at Neuburg an der Donau. Through inheritance, he later became Elector Palatine, where his additions to Heidelberg Castle, known as the Ottheinrichsbau, made him one of the most important builders of the German Renaissance.

Sources

Landshut
16th century in Bavaria
Electoral Palatinate
1500s conflicts
1500s in Europe
1503 in Europe
1504 in Europe
1505 in Europe
1503 in the Holy Roman Empire
1504 in the Holy Roman Empire
1505 in the Holy Roman Empire
Maximilian I, Holy Roman Emperor